Simlops is a genus of spiders in the family Oonopidae. It was first described in 2014 by Bonaldo, Ott & Ruiz. , it contains 15 species.

Species
Simlops comprises the following species:
Simlops bandeirante Ott, 2014
Simlops bodanus (Chickering, 1968)
Simlops cachorro Ruiz, 2014
Simlops campinarana Brescovit, 2014
Simlops cristinae Santos, 2014
Simlops guatopo Brescovit, 2014
Simlops guyanensis Santos, 2014
Simlops jamesbondi Bonaldo, 2014
Simlops juruti Bonaldo, 2014
Simlops machadoi Ott, 2014
Simlops miudo Ruiz, 2014
Simlops nadinae Ruiz, 2014
Simlops pennai Bonaldo, 2014
Simlops platnicki Bonaldo, 2014
Simlops similis Ott, 2014

References

Oonopidae
Araneomorphae genera
Spiders of South America
Spiders of the Caribbean